Chen Zhengbin (born 14 March 1972) is a Chinese wrestler. He competed in the men's freestyle 48 kg at the 1992 Summer Olympics.

References

1972 births
Living people
Chinese male sport wrestlers
Olympic wrestlers of China
Wrestlers at the 1992 Summer Olympics
Place of birth missing (living people)
20th-century Chinese people